Thomas Burke (circa 1747December 2, 1783) was an Irish physician, lawyer, and statesman who lived in Hillsborough, North Carolina. He represented North Carolina as a delegate to the Continental Congress and was the third governor of the state. He was the first Catholic governor of North Carolina.

Biography
Burke was born in Tiaquin, County Galway, Ireland, around 1747. By 1764, he had emigrated. Thomas went to Virginia and practiced medicine for several years. He studied law and began his practice in Norfolk, Virginia. He became an early supporter of the American Revolution, writing tracts in opposition to the Stamp Act. In 1774, he moved to Hillsborough, North Carolina.

Burke's neighbors made him a member of the Fifth North Carolina Provincial Congress that met in Halifax in 1776. He participated in the debate that led to North Carolina's new constitution. He was chosen as a delegate to the Second Continental Congress on December 20, 1776, and arrived in Philadelphia to take his seat on February 4, 1777. He was a strong states' rights advocate, although he moderated this view somewhat by 1781. In September 1777, most of Congress prepared to flee Philadelphia as the British advanced. Burke, instead, went to join General Nash's North Carolina troops defending the city. He was present at the Battle of Brandywine before rejoining the Congress.

Burke served in Congress until 1781, when he was chosen to be governor of North Carolina. He returned home to assume that office in June. As governor, he actively supported and encouraged the militia in its resistance to British and Loyalist forces. Then, in September, he was captured by Tories under the command of Col. David Fanning. After a failed rescue attempt by patriot militia under the command of John Butler at the Battle of Lindley's Mill, Burke was imprisoned by the British on James Island near Charleston, South Carolina.

Burke was allowed to live freely on the island under parole, but he was subject to mistreatment and deplorable conditions and feared assassination. Finally, on January 16, 1782, he escaped and went to North Carolina. He wrote to the British that he still considered himself under the terms of his parole. He resumed his governor duties before being released from parole through an exchange. Accordingly, many North Carolinians and Continental officers considered that he had broken his word and remained under a cloud of dishonor. In April 1782, he did not stand for re-election to the governorship and was succeeded by Alexander Martin.

Burke's health never recovered from his term of imprisonment. He retired to his home, known as Tyaquin, in Orange County]. He died there on December 2, 1783, and was buried on his plantation near Hillsborough. The gravesite is about 350 feet north of what is now Governor Burke Road.

Burke was claimed to have been a practicing Roman Catholic who succeeded politically in an era when Catholics held little political power and were often discriminated against.

Namesakes
Burke County, North Carolina, is named for him.

See also
 List of U.S. state governors born outside the United States

References

Gravesite Photo and Details
 
 
 

1747 births
1783 deaths
18th-century Irish people
Continental Congressmen from North Carolina
18th-century American politicians
Governors of North Carolina
Members of the North Carolina Provincial Congresses
Politicians from County Galway
Kingdom of Ireland emigrants to the Thirteen Colonies
American Roman Catholics
American slave owners
Burke County, North Carolina